The Olympic oaks or, informally, Hitler oaks are the English oak trees grown from the year-old  saplings given to the gold medal winners of the 1936 Olympic Games, in Berlin, which was seen as Adolf Hitler's games. They were called "Olympic oaks" at the time. Not many are known, and fewer have survived. Not all of the trees, if any, were presented by Hitler; Lovelock's, for example, was presented by Dr Theodor Lewald, and Boardman's was collected by members of his crew. 130 gold medals were awarded, and a corresponding number of trees.

Germany
While the largest number of oaks were given to German athletes, who won the most medals, many are said to be planted near the stadium, though no record was kept, and they would be difficult to identify among the many oaks in the vicinity.

New Zealand
 Jack Lovelock's tree is at Timaru Boys' High School.

Sweden
 Ivar Johansson's tree is in Folkparken, Norrköping. The tree was first planted in Johanssons private garden, but in 1960 it was donated to the city of Norrköping.

United Kingdom
 The sapling presented to Jack Beresford was planted in the grounds of Bedford School.  It was removed many years later when building work was undertaken. The wood was used to make presentation shields for the rowing club.
 Harold Whitlock's sapling was presented to Hendon School, and was removed due to fungal disease in July 2007.
 Christopher Boardman's oak was planted in How Hill, Norfolk but was eventually killed by honey fungus. In early 2017 the remaining tree stump was carved into a sailing boat and olympic rings.

United States
 Jesse Owens won four gold medals and so had four trees.
 One tree was planted in James Rhodes High School in Cleveland, Ohio.
 One may have been planted at Ohio State University.
 As of 2022, Cornelius Johnson's tree was still standing in the yard of his childhood home in Koreatown, Los Angeles.
 John Woodruff (Connellsville, Pennsylvania) was the first African American to win gold in the 1936 Olympics (800 Meters). He brought his oak home to Connellsville and planted it in the northwest corner of the High School Stadium (Campbell Field) in Connellsville where it was still standing as of 2022.

See also
 Forest swastikas, arboreal relics of Nazi Germany

References

External links
 Film of Jack Lovelock's race and presentation with the Lovelock Oak

Trees in culture
1936 Summer Olympics
Quercus